Chandrasen Jadon is an Indian politician and is Member of Parliament from Firozabad parliamentary constituency of Uttar Pradesh Chandrasen Jadon is from Sirsaganj town in Firozabad.

References

1950 births
Living people
India MPs 2019–present
Lok Sabha members from Uttar Pradesh
Bharatiya Janata Party politicians from Uttar Pradesh
People from Firozabad